Mictopsichia marowijneae is a species of moth of the family Tortricidae. It is found in Suriname and Guyana.

The wingspan is about 13 mm. The ground colour of the forewings is orange and is visible in the form of a submedian blotch at the costa, basal and subapical streaks and indistinct marks along the subterminal refractive line and termen. The hindwings are orange with brownish apical fascia and spot.

Etymology
The name refers to the name of the river at which the species was collected, the Marowijne.

References

Moths described in 2009
Mictopsichia
Moths of South America
Taxa named by Józef Razowski